The 1978–79 All-Ireland Senior Club Football Championship was the ninth staging of the All-Ireland Senior Club Football Championship since its establishment by the Gaelic Athletic Association in 1970-71.

Thomond College were the defending champions, however, they failed to qualify after being between in the Limerick County Championship.

On 17 March 1979, Nemo Rangers won the championship following a 2-09 to 1-03 defeat of Scotstown in the All-Ireland final at Croke Park. It was their second championship title overall and their first title since 1973.

Results

Munster Senior Club Football Championship

First round

Semi-finals

Final

All-Ireland Senior Club Football Championship

Quarter-final

Semi-finals

Final

Championship statistics

Miscellaneous

 Walsh Island won the Leinster Club Championship for the first time in their history.
 Nemo Rangers became the first team to win four Munster Club Championship titles.
 Scotstown won the Ulster Club Championship for the first time in their history. They were also the first team from Monaghan to win the provincial title.

References

1978 in Gaelic football
1979 in Gaelic football